The Ouargla Tramway (in ) is a system of public transport in Ouargla, Algeria. The first section includes  of route and 16 stops and commenced public operations on 20 March 2018.

Stations
The stations are listed from the western suburbs to the eastern suburbs:

References

Ouargla
2018 establishments in Algeria
Light rail in Algeria
Railway lines opened in 2018